The Cebu tamaraw (Bubalus cebuensis) is a fossil dwarf buffalo discovered in the Philippines, and first described in 2006.

Anatomy and morphology
The most distinctive feature of B. cebuensis was its small size. Large contemporary domestic water buffalo stand 2 m (roughly 6 ft) at the shoulder and can weigh up to   1 tonne (around 2,000 lb), B. cebuensis would have stood only 75 cm (about 2 ft 6 in) and weighed about 150 to 160 kg (around 300 lb), smaller than another dwarf species B. mindorensis.

The fossil specimen is likely Pleistocene or Holocene in age.

Evolutionary history
The fossil was discovered in a horizontal tunnel in soft karst around 50 m elevation in K-Hill near Balamban, Cebu Island, the Philippines, by mining engineer Michael Armas. The fossil was donated to America's Field Museum, where it stayed unanalyzed for almost 50 years.

See also
 List of extinct animals of the Philippines

References

Bovines
Prehistoric bovids
Holocene extinctions
Pleistocene mammals of Asia
Pleistocene even-toed ungulates
Fossil taxa described in 2006